The Losers is a comic book series written by Andy Diggle and illustrated by Jock, and published by the Vertigo imprint of DC Comics. It ran for 32 issues from August 2003 to March 2006.

The idea was very loosely based on the original The Losers for DC Comics, a group of World War II soldiers, although Diggle maintains he has never read a single issue of the original series.

The series was adapted into a film of the same name that was released in 2010.

Publication history
Andy Diggle has talked about the development of the concept, which developed from conversations with editor Will Dennis about doing an original title at Vertigo:

He originally thought about returning to the original and doing a war comic:

The ongoing monthly comic concluded in 2006 after 32 issues, but it was never cancelled. According to Diggle, "everyone always thinks it got cancelled—it was always intended to be two or three years long".

Plot
The Losers' reimagining was set against events surrounding and including the War on Terror. Originally a Special Forces team integrated with the Central Intelligence Agency. In the 90s, the Losers were betrayed by their handler, Max, and left for dead following the conclusion of their operation. Eager for revenge and the opportunity to remove their names from a secret CIA death list, the Losers regroup and conduct covert operations against the CIA and its interests, uncovering startling operations spearheaded by the enigmatic Max, whose influence within the CIA and U.S. government is unparalleled.

Characters
 Lt. Col. Franklin Clay – The Leader, easily identified by a consistent use of black suits without ties. A meticulous planner, initiative-taker and an excellent leader, Clay harbors the largest grudge against Max, at times appearing visibly angry at the mere mention of his name. He is possibly the grandson of Sarge Clay from the original Losers comic book series, as he told his old commanding general: "My grandfather died fighting an Axis that was 'just following orders'".
 Cpt. William Roque – The second-in-command, easily identified by the large, vertical scar down the right side of his face and icy demeanor. His ruthless thirst for money motivates a majority of his actions, including the serial betrayal of the Losers and many of his underlings. He is known for having a collection of daggers and knives, which he fights with when not using a gun.
 Cpt. Jake Jensen – The hacker, characterized by his spiky blonde hair, glasses and a conspicuous goatee on his chin. Known for his motormouth that often gets him into trouble and provides for a variety of conversational tangents. He is able to crack all but the most complex encryption algorithms with ease, and is highly skilled in using most computer and communications systems.
 Sgt. Carlos 'Cougar' Alvarez – The sniper, identified by his cowboy hat and haunted demeanor. He is morose and laconic as a result of a traumatic combat incident in Afghanistan.
 Sgt. Linwood 'Pooch' Porteous – The pilot, identifiable by his shaved head and laid-back appearance, known to operate any ground, air or sea vehicle with ease. Despite his involvement with the CIA and the Special Forces, he is married with children. He is occasionally mocked by the other Losers, especially Jensen, for referring to himself in the third person.
 Aisha al-Fadhil – The loose cannon, identified by her eyebrow piercing and tied-back hair. Partners with the Losers in light of their common goal of killing Max. She is skilled in all combat skills, with particular emphasis on melee and reconnaissance, stemming from a harsh upbringing in Afghanistan and Pakistan, primarily fighting as a child against Soviet soldiers during the Soviet–Afghan War. She is a cold-blooded killer who prefers to leave corpses rather than survivors when she engages the enemy.

Collected editions
The complete run has been collected into a series of trade paperbacks. All stories are written by Andy Diggle, with Jock on the majority of art duties:
 Ante Up (collects #1–6, 158 pages, 2004)
 Double Down (with Shawn Martinbrough, collects #7–12, 144 pages, 2004)
 Trifecta (with Nick Dragotta and Alé Garza, collects #13–19, 168 pages, 2005)
 Close Quarters (with Ben Oliver, collects #20–25, 144 pages, 2006)
 Endgame (with Colin Wilson, collects #26–32, 168 pages, September 2006)

In 2010, a "double volume", including both Ante Up and Double Down, was released to tie in with the film adaptation and a second book to collect the rest of the series:
 Book 1 (collects #1–12, 304 pages)
 Book 2 (collects #13–32, 480 pages)

Reception
In the week after the film's release, The Losers: Book 1 topped the New York Times paperback graphic books list.

Awards
In 2004, the series won the Eagle Award for "Favourite New Comicbook" and was nominated for the "Best New Series" Eisner Award. In 2006, Jock was nominated for the "Best Cover Artist" Eisner Award, for The Losers.

Film adaptation

A live-action adaptation of The Losers was released on April 23, 2010. The film was developed by Warner Bros. Pictures and Dark Castle Entertainment. The Losers was directed by Sylvain White, with a screenplay by Peter Berg and James Vanderbilt. Tim Story was considered for directing. The actors starring in the film are Jeffrey Dean Morgan, Zoe Saldana, Chris Evans, Idris Elba, Columbus Short and Jason Patric.

References

External links

 
 
 

2003 comics debuts
Comics characters introduced in 2003
DC Comics adapted into films